Butylka (Бутылка, Russian for bottle) is the name of a museum and hotel, sometimes also called the Spirit Museum Hotel. It is located in the village Tîrnauca, 10 km away from Tiraspol, the de facto capital of the unrecognized state of Transnistria (officially a part of Moldova). The hotel was founded in 1988. 

The museum is notable for being housed inside a five-story structure shaped like a giant bottle. It is listed by the Guinness Book of World Records as the largest building in the world in the shape of a bottle. The museum features owner Grigory Korzun's vast collection of liquor.

References

External links 
Official site
Old official site
Butylka wine museum

Hotels in Transnistria
Museums in Transnistria
Hotels in Moldova
Museums in Moldova